Symplocos cuneata is a species of plant in the family Symplocaceae. It is endemic to Sri Lanka.

Flowers
Pinkish-white; Inflorescence - short, adpressed hairy raceme.

References

 http://www.theplantlist.org/tpl/record/kew-2579195

Endemic flora of Sri Lanka
cuneata
Vulnerable plants